Nemapogon reisseri is a moth of the family Tineidae. It is found in mainland Greece and on Crete and the Dodecanese Islands.

References

Moths described in 1983
Nemapogoninae